Noam Surrier (born 6 August 1981 in France) is a French retired footballer who is last known to have played for JK Warkaus from 2007 to 2008 and have played for FC Lahti under Veikkausliiga Finish football league.

Finland

Exiting Paris to come to terms with a Finnish club mid-spring 2004, Surrier ended up with Lahti, breaking his thigh at the League Cup and missing the opener of the 2004 Veikkausliiga to recuperate. Returning for the league meeting away in Inter, the Frenchman went home to France that June.

References

External links 
 at Footballdatabase.eu 
 Veikkausliiga Profile

Association football forwards
French expatriate footballers
FC Lahti players
Living people
FC Aurillac Arpajon Cantal Auvergne players
Kokkolan Palloveikot players
AJ Auxerre players
French footballers
Veikkausliiga players
1981 births
FC Haka players
Stade Briochin players
FC Hämeenlinna players
Expatriate footballers in Finland
Montauban FCTG players